This article contains episode information and plot summaries from the British television programme Balamory. Season 1 was broadcast on 2 September 2002. The main cast are listed on the main Balamory page.

Episodes 

2002 Scottish television seasons
Balamory